Paula Vázquez Picallo (born 26 November 1974) is a Spanish television presenter, also known for her modelling career in the fashion industry as well as her acting.

She was born at Ferrol, Galicia.

National career as a television presenter in Spain

 Un, dos, tres... responda otra vez (1993–1994), Televisión Española.
 La vuelta a la fama (1994), Televisión Española.
 No te olvides el cepillo de dientes (1994), Antena 3.
 Luar (1995), TVG.
 El rastrillo (1995), Antena 3.
 Sonrisas de España (1996), Antena 3.
 Mira quién viene esta noche (1997), Antena 3.
 La parodia nacional (1997–1998), Antena 3.
 Inocente, inocente (1998), Telecinco.
 El juego del euromillón (1998–2001), Telecinco.
 Fort Boyard (2001), Telecinco.
 Gran Hermano (2002), Telecinco.
 Mira tú por dónde (2002), Antena 3.
 El gran test (2002), Antena 3.
 Por ti (2003), Antena 3.
 La isla de los famosos (2003–2005), Antena 3.
 La selva de los famosos, Antena 3.
 Aventura en África, Antena 3.
 Los más (2005–2006), Antena 3.
 Misión Eurovisión 2007 (2007), Televisión Española.
 Fama ¡A Bailar! (2008–2010), Cuatro; (2018–2019), #0.
 Pekín Express (2008), Cuatro.
 El Número Uno (2012), Antena 3.
 El almacén de Top Chef (2013), Antena 3.
 Campanadas 2013-2014 (2013), Antena 3.
 Especial 25 aniversario (2015), Antena 3.
 El Puente (2017–2018), #0.
 Ultimate Beastmaster  (2017), Netflix.
 Celebrity Bake Off España (2021–), Amazon Prime Video.

Showbiz industry awards in Spain

 Antena de Oro (2004) in the category of Televisión, for La isla de los famosos .
 Nominated to a TP de Oro as 'Best Female Presenter' for "El Juego del Euromillón" in 1998, 1999 and 2000.

References

External links
 

1974 births
Living people
People from Galicia (Spain)
People from Ferrol, Spain
Spanish film actresses
Spanish television actresses
Spanish television presenters
Spanish women television presenters
Actresses from Galicia (Spain)